Death Match, is a 2004 horror novel by American author Lincoln Child. It is his second solo novel. In it, he takes a cursory glance at the world of electronic matchmaking, and takes it to its natural technological conclusion—for a substantial sum of money, the computer will locate a 'perfect match' for anyone.

Plot introduction
Every once in a rare while, the most perfect of 'perfect' matches ('supercouples, of 100% compatibility) is located. Then tragedy suddenly strikes. One of the "supercouples" is found dead in their Arizona home, an "unquestionable" double suicide.

Child's analysis of the topic proves a useful tool to opine on the topics of psychology, relationships, cutting-edge computer technology and artificial intelligence.

2004 American novels
American science fiction novels
American horror novels
Novels by Lincoln Child
2004 science fiction novels
Novels set in Arizona
Novels about artificial intelligence